The Mitsubishi Cordia is a compact hatchback-coupé manufactured by Mitsubishi Motors between 1982 and 1990.  Alongside the Tredia and Starion, the Cordia is one of the first cars imported and sold in the United States by Mitsubishi without the help of Chrysler Corporation, which owned a stake in Mitsubishi and sold its models as captive imports. The Cordia XP was the model sold at the Japanese Car Plaza retail chain, while the Cordia XG was sold at the Galant Shop chain. The Cordia XG model had a somewhat smaller front grille.

The Cordia was one of the first mass-market cars to offer an optional electronic instrument cluster using a liquid-crystal display (LCD).

Overview 
Offered between the existing Mitsubishi Starion, Galant and Lancer models, the Cordia (along with the Tredia) used front-wheel drive and was similar in design to the Mirage, with the exception of its larger size. To further set the Cordia apart from its saloon counterpart, it received a deeper fascia which embraced the driver.

Mitsubishi incorporated MacPherson strut/beam axle suspension, front disc brakes, manual or automatic transmission, and a choice of three engines: a 68 hp 1.4-litre, a  1.6-litre, and a  turbocharged 1.6-litre engine. Some export markets also received a carb-fed  1.6-litre. A US version of the 2.0-litre generated 88 hp for the 1984 model.

The cars received a mild facelift in 1983 and the option of four-wheel drive was offered in 1984 in Japanese domestic markets. The engines were modified in 1985 to allow the cars to run on unleaded fuel with the introduction of a 1.8-litre  in both  naturally aspirated and Turbocharged variants output at 135 hp (101kw) in Europe and the UK and 116 hp (86.5kw) in the USA to cope with the lower 87 octane unleaded gasoline. The Cordia sold in the United States until the 1988 model year. Japanese manufacture was discontinued in 1990.

In Australia, the Cordia AA series was released in late 1983. An update, titled AB Series, arrived with a different grille, upgraded interior other minor changes in 1984. The final AC model was modified to run on unleaded fuel in late 1985. Production ceased in 1988. Two trim levels were available, the naturally aspirated 1.8-litre GSL and the turbocharged GSR. The early (leaded) GSRs were fitted with 13-inch alloy wheels; unleaded cars came fitted with chrome alloy 14-inch wheels. The 1800 Turbocharged Cordias were considered great performers at the time in the Australian market, which produced 110 kW, (similar to normally aspirated engines with almost 3 times the cubic capacity of the Cordia's 1800cc engine.) It was able to achieve the 1/4 mile (400 metres) in 15.9 seconds and a top speed of 200 km/hr which in 1984/85 was exceptional for an 1800cc engine and boasted similar performance to cars approximately 3 times its price, so was truly the performance bargain of the mid 80's in Australia .

When released in mid 1984 with its 4G62T 8-valve ECI (Electronically Controlled Injection) engine, the GSR AA Turbo version was something of a 4 cylinder performance phenomenon exciting the Australian motoring press and car enthusiasts alike until the last incarnation of the GSR the AC model was officially released January 1, 1986 to comply to the new Australian government's  emissions requirements and was heavily detuned to run on the only available at the time 91 octane unleaded fuel and output was dropped by almost 20% to 90KW to cope with this.

This markedly reduced the performance of both the normally aspirated and turbocharged models.

The GSR was trialled as a pursuit car by NSW Police, and was reportedly the first Turbocharged vehicle used by Australian Police.

The USA version had the enhanced low speed crash resistant deeper bumpers which were also used on the NZ Turbocharged variants.

The places where these cars met with most enthusiastic success was in Australia and New Zealand. The success of the Cordia was based on its spirited performance for its cost.

In New Zealand the Cordia was assembled, with the Tredia that it is based on, first by Todd Motors, and later by Mitsubishi New Zealand. The cars were imported as CKD kits and were built with about 41% local content including glass, upholstery, carpet, wiring harnesses and radiators. Both naturally aspirated engine models and turbocharged versions were made. NZ did not have an unleaded petrol version and when ULP was introduced in the nineties, the naturally aspirated GSL ran on premium unleaded petrol without any modification.

References

External links 
Official history of the Cordia & Tredia, Mitsubishi Motors South Africa website
Specifications for Mitsubishi vehicles at Carfolio.com

Cordia
Front-wheel-drive vehicles
All-wheel-drive vehicles
Cars introduced in 1982
1990s cars
Compact cars
Hatchbacks
Cars discontinued in 1990